The SIG Sauer P238 is a compact .380 ACP caliber, single-action pistol announced by SIG Sauer at the 2009 SHOT Show. It is modelled after the M1911, similar to the Colt Mustang. Grip panels are fluted polymer making this an all-metal frame firearm in competition with plastic-framed pistols in the same class as the Ruger LCP and the Kel-Tec P-3AT.

The P238 has an aluminium frame and a stainless steel slide (with the exception of the HD model which is all stainless steel). Initially, P238 pistols had standard sights with night sights as a more expensive option. However, all models currently produced have night sights standard. Starting in 2012, many variants have an ambidextrous thumb safety standard or as an option.

Variants
When introduced in 2009, the P238 was available in a matte black finish and a two-tone finish with a matte silver colored slide and black frame. Since then, SIG Sauer has produced a number of variants including some short run commemorative editions. Among the variants are versions with various finishes, with a stainless steel frame and different grips and embellishments.

The SIG Sauer P938, chambered in 9×19mm Parabellum and introduced at the 2011 SHOT Show, is a slightly larger version of the P238.

Recall
In July 2009, SIG Sauer issued a recall of all P238s sold within a certain serial number range, which they referred to as a "Mandatory Safety Upgrade". The reason stated for the recall was that a small number of P238s were built with defective manual safety levers, leading to "the remote possibility that the gun could fire unintentionally, thus creating a risk of injury or death", although SIG Sauer emphasized that no such injuries had actually occurred. The recall only applied to pistols within a specific range of serial numbers, DA000501 to DA003216, and did not affect any 27Axxxxxx serialized pistols.

References

External links
 P238 Nitron video by Sig Sauer
 P238 Legion video by Sig Sauer

.380 ACP semi-automatic pistols
Semi-automatic pistols of the United States
SIG Sauer semi-automatic pistols
Weapons and ammunition introduced in 2009